Royce Cronin is an English New Zealand-born actor.

His most recent credit is the role of Capa Team Leader in the 2023 film Gran Turismo. 

Previous roles include the 2018 feature Bohemian Rhapsody on the life of Freddie Mercury and Michel Van Rijn in The Iconoclast.

Previously known for the popular role of Luke Warrington in five's one time flagship soap Family Affairs, where he played the role of Luke in the popular Warrington family.

Royce is also well known on both sides of the Atlantic for the role of Chris Silverstone in the popular children's series 24seven which aired in both the UK and The U.S. and had 2 major seasons. The show mainly centered on the one going love triangle involving fellow characters Miles and Anya.

He is also a multi instrumentalist.

Starring roles 
Family Affairs as Luke Warrington (2000–2002)
24Seven as Chris Silverstone (2001) 
Casualty as Chris  (2003) 
D-Day 6.6.1944 as Albert Fraley (2004)
The Iconoclast as Michel Van Rijn (2017)

External links 

 24seven Website

New Zealand male television actors
Living people
Year of birth missing (living people)